Dennis Caldirola (born 1948) – better known to record collectors by the stage-name, Dennis The Fox – is an American singer, songwriter, and keyboardist who for many years has been most notable for his soulful compositions that were recorded by prominent jazz, soul, and disco artists such as Dee Dee Bridgewater (b. 1950) and Phyllis Hyman (1949–1995).

Active as a performing musician since the mid-1960s, Caldirola was initially a member of various teenage rock ‘n’ roll bands during the Pacific Northwest's “Louie Louie” era. By the 1970s his songwriting talent was flourishing and various other artists began recording his songs. In an effort to score a record deal he cut an album's worth of tunes that represented the full range of his abilities – songs that touched on the rock, psych, soul, funk, country and pop genres. 

Released as an independent DIY project on an obscure Seattle-based label, his Mothertrucker LP was released in 1972 to no great fanfare, and basically sank without a trace. Meanwhile, Caldirola simply carried on with his life. He played in other bands, worked in the music biz as a professional song plugger, penned songs that were recorded by various artists, and held other entertainment industry management-level jobs.

In the meantime, whole new generations of music fans, vintage vinyl collectors – and eventually hip-hop DJs – discovered that old Mothertrucker album and found some of the funk grooves to be phat. In recent years the LP has gained a robust cult following and various songs on it have been sampled for other artists’ recordings, and included in a CD/book set (Enjoy The Experience – Homemade Records 1958–1992), as well as on numerous compilation discs. The original Mothertrucker album has become a valuable and highly sought-after collector's item, and was finally reissued on vinyl by Modern Harmonic records in 2017.

Early life and career

Born in Miles City, Montana, on March 22, 1948, to a native Italian father (Carlo Caldirola) and an Irish-American mother (Della Floyd). While an infant the Caldirola family moved to Seattle's Italian-dominated neighborhood – “Garlic Gulch” – in the Rainier Valley area just east of Beacon Hill, young Dennis was raised bilingually, and the Caldirolas were warmly welcomed into the community.

Caldirola started learning piano in first grade, and later while in high school in the summer of 1964 he helped form a band, the Rum Runners, that played teen dances around town, and fabled rooms including Parker's Ballroom and the Lake Hills Roller Rink. Their biggest gig was opening up for British rock group, the Yardbirds, at the Eagles Auditorium on July 30, 1967. The group broke up in September 1968 when Caldirola opted to move on from Seattle University and continue his college studies in Florence, Italy. Then, upon his return, Caldirola played the Hammond organ with HUGG, a band that had been around since 1968. He performed with them into 1971 when he committed himself to becoming a genuine rock star and began focusing on writing original material.

1971-72: Mothertrucker

By 1971 Caldirola was associating with Dave Clark – a local businessman who began serving as his de facto manager. Together they concocted a plan aimed at scoring Caldirola a recording contract and setting him on the path to fame and fortune. The first step was dropping his mouthful-of-a-birth-name, and adopting the stage-name, “Dennis The Fox.” Next, they corralled a bunch of top Seattle musicians including: Robbie Straube (drums) from Merrilee Rush & the Turnabouts; Toby Bowen (guitar) and Bobby Anderson (drums) from Bighorn; Fred Zeufeldt (drums) from the Viceroys, the Surprise Package, and Bighorn; Buddy Stewart (bass) from Bad Manners; and Dave Belzer from both HUGG and in an early iteration of the future superstar band, Heart.

These and additional players all gathered into a shuttered downtown menswear shop (Kalifornia Kreations) that Clark held the lease on. An audio engineer named John A. Peterson set up his gear and they proceeded (late at night after general traffic noise outside died down) to cut a batch of Caldirola's songs – tunes selected to demonstrate the breadth of Caldirola's compositional skills. As he once told Eothen “Egon” Alapatt of the Now-Again record company: “We were trying to get a record deal so we cut all of these tapes, of various songs, in various styles, to show how versatile I could be.”  
Then in September 1972, Caldirola and Clark headed south to Hollywood and began hustling the tapes around to various record companies. “To our dismay,” the songwriter once recalled, “the record labels found the material ‘too versatile’ for their marketing purposes.”  Three months passed by, the guys ran out of money, and they necessarily returned home to Seattle. That's when they decided to release it independently on John A. Peterson’s MusArt label – which had previously been used for releasing religious choir LPs, but now would be useful for issuing Caldirola’s album, Mothertrucker (MusArt 801).

They ordered 1,000 units from a pressing plant, and also arranged to have a similar number of cardboard jackets – which included this bold declaration: “If We Told You The Biggest Rockstar Of The Mid-70’s Would Be This Four-Eyed Italian From Seattle, Washington, You’d Laugh Your Ass Off. Start Laughing.”—printed up. Upon receiving the discs, alas, it was discovered that many were defective and had skips within the first tracks. So, Caldirola and Clark just decided to sit down in his parents’ living room and manually test all 1,000 of them on the family's hi-fi. In the end they discarded about 400 units, and the remaining 600 were then placed into covers that the enterprising duo also had to glue together one-at-a-time by hand. Then they loaded the finished product into the trunk of a car and took the LPs around to several local record shops that accepted small quantities on a consignment basis.

Mothertrucker boasted eye-grabbing post-Psychedelic Era artwork created by Seattle's Robert Barbarus and a dozen songs featuring lyrical themes that precluded any hope of being embraced by mainstream radio. Among the following dozen songs, Caldirola takes listeners on a mind-boggling tour of a landscape that includes vivid plotlines, sketchy characters including a mean man-eating truck-driving woman and plenty of pearls of worldly wisdom like: “When it comes to really livin’, you're just somewhere in between, there's a high-steppin’ side-steppin’ life outside, you ain’t never seen.” The songs that comprise Mothertrucker offer daring listeners an instructive glimpse into that very world.

1973-85: The Music Biz

Caldirola managed to sell the bulk of his Mothertrucker LP stock, without achieving his dream of becoming a global rock star. But he did create a music career that lasted well into his thirties. A list of notable highlights from this period would include his time in 1976 playing keyboards with a revived first generation local band, Tiny Tony & the Statics.

Then, between 1979 and 1981, Caldirola hooked up with Thom Bell – the esteemed Philadelphia-based producer who a long track record of scoring hits for the likes of the Delfonics, Dionne Warwick, and the Stylistics. Bell had recently relocated to Seattle where he began working out of the town’s best studio, Kaye Smith, cutting tracks there with artists including Elton John and the Spinners. Caldirola worked as a Professional Manager with Mighty Three Music – the publishing arm of Philadelphia International Records and Thom Bell Productions – where he assessed new songs, coached songwriters, and steered worthy songs to many nationally recognized artists. Along the way, a few of Caldirola’s originals also got placed with up-and-coming singers. In 1980 Dee Dee Bridgewater released her version of “When Love Comes Knockin’”, which Caldirola co-wrote with Joe Erickson from the funk band Push – as producer, Bell took a writer's credit). Then in 1981 Phyllis Hyman recorded their “Just Another Face In The Crowd.”

That same year Jr. Cadillac – the Northwest's premiere roots rock band (as founded in 1970 by members of several first generation rock bands including: the Wailers, Frantics, Sonics, Redcoats, and Mark V) – released a recording of “(The Original) Comeback Girl” co-written by Caldirola with the band's leader, Ned Neltner. In 1981 Caldirola also moved back to Italy where he assembled a rockabilly band, Dennis & the Jets, who became very popular up through 1984 when he returned to Seattle.

Caldirola carried on in various entertainment industry roles including: working as: a booking agent with Far West Entertainment; an assistant cruise director on board ships for the Princess Cruise line (1981–1983); deputy cruise director for Sundance Cruises (1985–1986). Ever the showman, Caldirola eventually also launched a new career as a popular auctioneer-for-hire, and simultaneously took on the ongoing role as Executive Director of Seattle's annual Festa Italiana, the Italian festival at Seattle Center.

2004–17: Mothertrucker (A Slight Return)

Life went on, Caldirola became a father, and the years passed by. Mothertrucker seemed to be a nearly forgotten relic from the distant past. But then suddenly in 2004 someone sent Caldirola a copy of WaxPoetics magazine (issue No. 8) which featured an essay by funk music expert Dante Carfagna titled “Left-Field Americana: Private Press LPs” that included coverage of Mothertrucker. Dante Carfagna began by riffing humorously on the tragic topic of Elvis impersonators and how so many guys are seemingly born with that “crippling affliction.” Then, before doling out crumbs of praise, Carfagna proceeds to insulting Caldirola's full mature voice – not to mention his Disco Era tonsorial and sartorial splendor – “a twenty-something Seattle native and judging by the picture on the back of the LP, surely the ‘Fox’ part of his name doesn’t come from his average looks. His appearance does betray his voice though, as you’d tend to think he was on some Hot Tub ballads or Marina Rock epics judging from the snapshot. Instead the Fox sounds like a much older man who was...really affected by...Presley. ... But enough about his voice, for it's the music that would draw one to this obscure mid-‘70s release. … the album must have gotten Dennis laid on at least a few occasions, because if it didn’t all might have been for naught.” Our critic then concluded with understandably inaccurate conjecture about the entire album, imagining that it is “as if most of the music came from different sources and they need to tie it all down with a single vocalist.”  Nope. Every single song on Mothertrucker was produced from the creative mind of Dennis Caldirola. A bit “too versatile” perhaps? Not to the true fans of Caldirola's nearly-operatic baritone crooning and heartfelt storytelling-in-song.

As Caldirola would later tell Northwest music historian, Peter Blecha, “This was the first inkling I had that there were serious antique vinyl collectors out there searching for the damn thing.”  Indeed they were. On the rare occasion that the now 32-year old album surfaced in the marketplace it was selling at auction for over $500. One song from it, “Piledriver,” had developed such a fan-base that it was even bootlegged in Europe as a single on the Scorpio Sounds label (No. SS001). By 2007 Caldirola could not resist having his master tapes digitized and he rereleased Mothertrucker in compact disc form (MusArt MA 801).

Along the way over-the-top hyper-hyperbolic reviews of the album began surfacing in publications including The Stranger magazine. Patrick “The Lama” Lundborg, author of the Acid Archives book from 2006 described Mothertrucker as being a “Priceless loungerock extravaganza like if Jade Stone & Luv had John Ylvisaker on vocals.”  In 2013 noted collector and operator of the Now-Again label, Eothen “Egon” Alapatt, commented in an interview about Caldirola: “This guy really had it all and is one of the nicest, most normal guys you’ll ever meet. He just happened to make an album that sounds as if some seedy weirdo Northwestern biker dreg made it on his way to the pen.” 

Taking it at least a step or two further, Paul Major, simply raved: “Utterly dark and sleazy lowlife nirvana! Like seeing God in a burst condom stuck to the tailpipe of a rusty pimpmobile, finding out Jesus stole your mama, looking for the meaning of life in a puke pile by a truckstop motel … kinda scary how real this dude is! ‘One of the guys’ deep level real people music that sounds like no other LP in the universe. Everything about this sound could not possibly add up in anybody else's mind, but Dennis has put a new place on the map. Seedy singles bar action blends with loner westcoast beatpoet bones. One of those smart literate guys attracted to funky situations. Totally fucked up sense of humour...If psychedelia smelled like the little bed-chamber in a long-haul semi-trailer truck loaded with a shipment of Trojans for the sleaziest whorehouse in town ... you'd get some of the music, but it's probably just another layer of illusion Dennis is screwing about with, tons of hot guitar, organ, sax, sex, trashy femme vocal accents, astonishing delivery of lyrics from a zone twilight never leaves. The music ranges from seedy bluesy loser zones into fucker up dive bar epiphanies. I can't think of any other record more at the end of the road seeking salvation in the tawdry. Wicked sense of humour. ... If any LP in my own stash turns the end-of-the-night losers into big heroes ... this one does. ... I still figure I'll wake up tomorrow and find out it was one of my own deluded dreams, nobody could nail the vibe in the waking world.”

Compilations and samples

The dawning of the new millennium brought with it the first in an ongoing string of sightings of various songs from Mothertrucker being included on compilation albums. In 2001 “Piledriver” appeared on Yee-Haw! The Other Side of Country (Q.D. K. Media CD 039). In 2008 “Flight of the Phoenix” appeared on Keep On Struttin...’ – A Tribute To The Meters (Le Smoke Disque B001KYQSBA). In 2012 “Piledriver” appeared on Country Funk: 1969–1975 (Light In The Attic Records LITA 083) as it did in 2013 on Enjoy The Experience – Homemade Records 1958–1992 (Sinecure Books / Now-Again Records NA-5100-CD).

It was in late summer of 2005 that the first tune utilizing a sample from Mothertrucker was spotted. That was when the California-based record producer D.J. Shadow’s Funky Skunk disc (DJ Shadow/Obey Reconstruction B000BRONYQ) was released with a sample from “Piledriver.” Then in 2010 The Alchemist + Oh No’s Gangrene album (Decon Records DCN 101) was issued replete with a sample from “Bazooka” on the tune, “Take Drugs.”

Discography

As leader:

	Mothertrucker (1972) (MusArt MA 801 (stereo LP))
	Mothertrucker (2007) (MusArt MA 801 (stereo CD))
	Mothertrucker (2017) (Modern Harmonic MH-8025 (stereo LP))

As composer:

	Dee Dee Bridgewater, Dee Dee Bridgewater (1980) (Elektra Records 6E-306) featuring “When Love Comes Knockin’” co-written with Joe Erickson and Thom Bell
	Can’t We Fall In Love Again, Phyllis Hyman (1981) (Arista Records AL9544) featuring “Just Another Face In The Crowd” (lyrics: Caldirola / music: Joe Erickson)
	In For Life Jr. Cadillac (1981) (Great Northwest Record Company GNWR 006) featuring “(The Original) Comeback Girl” co-written with Ned Neltner
	Dennis & the Jets, 1984, (1984) private compact disc
	Yee-Haw! The Other Side of Country (2001) (Q.D. K. Media CD 039) - compilation featuring: “Piledriver”
	Funky Skunk, D.J. Shadow (2006) (DJ Shadow/Obey Reconstruction B000BRONYQ) featuring a sample from “Piledriver.”
	Legends, Malcolm Forest (2007) (Prestige Elite B001NCSIFI) featuring “Just Another Face In The Crowd.”
	Keep On Struttin...’ – A Tribute To The Meters (2008) (Le Smoke Disque B001KYQSBA) - compilation featuring: “Flight of the Phoenix”
	Only The Best of Dee Dee Bridgewater, Dee Dee Bridgewater (2009) (Collectables Records Col 1116) featuring “When Love Comes Knockin’” co-written with Dave Erickson and Thom Bell
	Gangrene, The Alchemist + Oh No (2010) (Decon Records DCN 101) featuring a sample from “Bazooka” on “Take Drugs”
	Enjoy The Experience – Homemade Records 1958–1992 (2013) (Sinecure Books / Now-Again Records NA-5100-CD) - compilation featuring: “Piledriver”
	Country Funk: 1969–1975 (2012) (Light In The Attic Records LITA 083) compilation featuring: “Piledriver”

References

Living people
1948 births
American singer-songwriters
People from Miles City, Montana